Narcissus blanchardii is a species of the genus Narcissus (daffodils) in the family Amaryllidaceae. It is classified in Section Jonquilla.

Taxonomy 
Established as a separate species by Zonneveld in 2008, based on Narcissus fernandesii var. major A.Fern., but with rather a complicated taxonomic history. However The Plant List prefers Narcissus flavus  as the accepted name. Akers suggests this is because Flora Iberica gives the latter term precedence (1816). Zonneveld himself, takes issue with this maintaining N. blanchardii as the correct name.

Distribution 
South central Portugal to central and south west Spain.

References

External links 
 N. flavus, by Pieter van Kouwenhoorn, Verzameling van Bloemen naar de Natuur geteekend door ca. 1620

blanchardii
Garden plants